Merry Xmas From X	 is a two-track EP by the American rock band X, released on October 9, 2009, by Anko Records. It consists of two classic Christmas songs, "Santa Claus Is Coming to Town" and "Jingle Bells", and was distributed only as a digital download.

Critical reception

The British magazine The List reviewed the EP, noting the "wicked jingly-jangly guitar solo" in "Santa Claus Is Coming to Town", but noting that it had little chart potential and was "a missed opportunity for fresh material".

Track listing
"Santa Claus Is Coming to Town" (J. Fred Coots, Haven Gillespie) – 2:09
"Jingle Bells" (James Lord Pierpont) – 3:24

References 

X (American band) albums
2009 EPs
2009 Christmas albums
Christmas albums by American artists
Covers albums